A shout or ring shout is an ecstatic, transcendent religious ritual, first practiced by African slaves in the West Indies and the United States, in which worshipers move in a circle while shuffling and stomping their feet and clapping their hands. Despite the name, shouting aloud is not an essential part of the ritual.

The ring shout was Christianized and practiced in some Black churches into the 20th century, and it continues to the present among the Gullah people of the Sea Islands and in "singing and praying bands" associated with many African American United Methodist congregations in Tidewater Maryland and Delaware. 

A more modern form, known still as a "shout" (or "praise break"), is practiced in many Black churches and non-Black Pentecostal churches to the present day.

Description
"Shouting" often took place during or after a Christian prayer meeting or worship service. Men and women moved in a circle in a counterclockwise direction, shuffling their feet, clapping, and often spontaneously singing or praying aloud. In Jamaica and Trinidad the shout was usually performed around a special second altar near the center of a church building. In the Sea Islands of Georgia and South Carolina, shouters formed a circle outdoors, around the church building itself.

In some cases, enslaved people retreated into the woods at night to perform shouts, often for hours at a time, with participants leaving the circle as they became exhausted. In the twentieth century, some African American churchgoers in the United States performed shouts by forming a circle around the pulpit, in the space in front of the altar, or around the nave.

Ring shouts were sometimes held for the dead. This custom has been practiced by traditional bands of carnival revelers in New Orleans.

Origin

The origins of the ring shout are usually assumed to be derived from African dance, and scholars usually point out the presence of melodic elements such as call-and-response singing and heterophony, as well as rhythmic elements such as tresillo and "hamboned" rhythm, and aesthetic elements such as counter-clockwise dancing and ecstasy, which makes ring shouts similar to ceremonies among people like the Ibos, Yorubas, Ibibios, Efiks, Bahumono and Bakongo.

Some scholars have suggested that the ritual may have originated among enslaved Muslims from West Africa as an imitation of tawaf, the mass procession around the Kaaba that is an essential part of the Hajj. If so, the word "shout" may come from Arabic shawṭ, meaning "a single run", such as a single circumambulation of the Kaaba, or an open space of ground for running.

According to musicologist Robert Palmer, the first written accounts of the ring shout date from the 1840s. The stamping and clapping in a circle was described as a kind of "drumming," and 19th-century observers associated it with the conversion of slaves to Christianity.

Influence
Sterling Stuckey in his book, Slave Culture: Nationalist Theory & the Foundations of Black America (1987) argues that ring shout was a unifying element of Africans in American colonies, from which field hollers, work songs, and spirituals evolved, followed by blues and jazz. In his article, "Ring Shout! Literary Studies, Historical Studies, and Black Music Inquiry", Samuel A. Floyd Jr. argues that many of the stylistic elements observed during the ring shout later laid the foundations of various black music styles developed during the nineteenth and twentieth centuries. According to Floyd, "...all of the defining elements of black music are present in the ring...".

These basic elements of ring shouts included calls, cries, and hollers; blue notes; call-and-response; and various rhythmic aspects. Examples of black music that would evolve from the ring include, but are not limited to, Afro-American burial music of New Orleans, the Blues, the Afro-American Symphony, as well as the music that has accompanied various dance forms also present in Afro-American culture.

The ring shout has developed into the modern "shout" (or "praise break") tradition now seen across the globe. Though augmented and interracialized by the Pentecostal tradition in the early 1900s and spreading to various denominations and churches thereafter, it is still primarily practiced among Christians of West African descent.

The ring shout continues today in Georgia with the McIntosh County Shouters.

Footnotes

References
Diouf, Sylviane. Servants of Allah: African Muslims Enslaved in the Americas. New York: New York University Press, 1998. 
Floyd Jr., Samuel A. "Ring Shout! Literary Studies, Historical Studies, and Black Music Inquiry." Black Music Research Journal, Vol. 22 (2002): 49-70. 
Parrish Lydia. Slave Songs of the Georgia Islands. 1942. Reprint, Athens, Ga.: University of Georgia Press, 1992. 
Turner, Lorenzo Dow. Africanisms in the Gullah Dialect. 1949. Reprint, New York: Arno Press, 1969.

External links
McIntosh County Shouters in New Georgia Encyclopedia
"Run Old Jeremiah": Echoes of the Ring Shout

African-American cultural history
African Americans and religion
Caribbean culture
Gullah mythology
Circle dances
African-American dance
Gullah culture